A Beveridge curve, or UV curve, is a graphical representation of the relationship between unemployment and the job vacancy rate, the number of unfilled jobs expressed as a proportion of the labour force. It typically has vacancies on the vertical axis and unemployment on the horizontal. The curve, named after William Beveridge, is hyperbolic-shaped and slopes downward, as a higher rate of unemployment normally occurs with a lower rate of vacancies. If it moves outward over time, a given level of vacancies would be associated with higher and higher levels of unemployment, which would imply decreasing efficiency in the labour market. Inefficient labour markets are caused by mismatches between available jobs and the unemployed and an immobile labour force.

The position on the curve can indicate the current state of the economy in the business cycle. For example, recessionary periods are indicated by high unemployment and low vacancies, corresponding to a position on the lower side of the 45° line, and high vacancies and low unemployment indicate the expansionary periods on the upper side of the 45° line.

In the United States, following the Great Recession, there was a marked shift in the Beveridge curve. A 2012 International Monetary Fund (IMF) said the shift can be explained in part by "extended unemployment insurance benefits" and "skill mismatch" between unemployment and vacancies.

History
The Beveridge curve, or UV curve, was developed in 1958 by Christopher Dow and Leslie Arthur Dicks-Mireaux. They were interested in measuring excess demand in the goods market for the guidance of Keynesian fiscal policies and took British data on vacancies and unemployment in the labour market as a proxy, since excess demand is unobservable. By 1958, they had 12 years of data available since the British government had started collecting data on unfilled vacancies from notification at labour exchanges in 1946. Dow and Dicks-Mireaux presented the unemployment and vacancy data in an unemployment-vacancy (UV) space and derived an idealised UV-curve as a rectangular hyperbola after they had connected successive observations. The UV curve, or Beveridge curve, enabled economists to use an analytical method, later known as UV-analysis, to decompose unemployment into different types of unemployment: deficient-demand (or cyclical) unemployment and structural unemployment. In the first half of the 1970s, that method was refined by economists of the National Institute of Economic and Social Research (NIESR), in London, so that a classification arose that corresponded to the 'traditional' classification: a division of unemployment into frictional, structural and deficient demand unemployment, according to a 1976 analysis. Both the Beveridge curve and the Phillips curve bear implicit macroeconomic notions of equilibrium in markets, but the notions are inconsistent and conflicting. Most likely, because the curve enabled economists to analyze many of the problems that Beveridge had addressed, like mismatch between unemployment and vacancies, at aggregate level and industry levels and trend v. cyclical changes and measurement problems of vacancies, the curve was named in the 1980s after William Beveridge, who never drew the curve, and the exact origin of the name remains obscure.

Movements
The Beveridge Curve can move for the following reasons:

 The matching process will determine how efficiently workers find new jobs. Improvements in the matching system would shift the curve towards the origin, because an efficient matching process will find jobs faster, filling vacancies and employing the unemployed. Improvements can be made by increasing the mobility of labour, the introduction of agencies, such as job centres, and lower rates of unionisation, according to a 2001 article on OECD that compared unemployment and wages in the OECD from the 1960s to the 1990s. 
Skills mismatches occur when changes in the skills employers want differ from the available skills in the labour pool. Greater mismatches would shift the Beveridge curve outward. If that were the driving factor behind the shift, one would expect to also see employers bid up wages for the few candidates who were desirable. Although the US Beveridge curve shifted outward in the 2010–2012 period, wages did not increase.
 Labour force participation rate: as the number looking for jobs increases relative to the total population, the unemployment rate increases, shifting the curve outwards from the origin. Labour force participation can increase due to changes in education, gender roles, population age and immigration.
 Long-term unemployment will push the curve outward from the origin, which could be caused by deterioration of human capital or a negative perception of the unemployed by the potential employers.
Frictional unemployment: a decrease in frictions would reduce the number of firms searching for employees and the number of unemployed searching for jobs. That would shift the curve towards the origin. Frictional unemployment is caused by job losses, resignations and job creation.
Economic and policy uncertainty may cause employers to hold vacancies open longer in the search for the "perfect candidate", particularly when there is high unemployment with a large number of candidates from which to choose. More uncertainty would tend to shift the curve outward.
Skill shortages should not be confused with "labour shortages", which identify an objective lack of workers in the market, independently of their skills, and it may arise because of limited geographical mobility, ageing populations or a labour market approaching full employment during an economic boom. Along with labour surpluses, labour shortages are one of the most traditional examples of labour market imbalances. What distinguishes an objective shortage of labour from a skill-related shortage (i.e. a special case of skill mismatch) is just the presence of a pool of unemployed individuals (non-discouraged job seekers) willing to take up jobs in the labour market considered at the ongoing rate. Nevertheless, even in presence of unemployment and assuming that there is adequate demand for labour in the market, it could still be difficult to point to a skill shortage for at least two reasons: if whether the unemployment we observe is frictional (just a short-term consequence of costly "search"), cyclical (caused by the business cycle) or structural cannot be established or if whether the position offered is accessible and/or attractive (such as whether or not the wage posted is competitive or at least rising with respect to other segments of the market that are not reporting unmet labour demands) cannot be established. 
In addition, skill shortages may be caused by both "horizontal" skill mismatch, when workers have qualifications/skills which are different than the one required by the firms, or by "vertical" skill mismatch, when workers' skills and qualifications are lower levels than what firms require. In the literature, scholars have also referred to skill mismatch and sometimes even to skill shortages to define a situation of the skills of the employed workers and those required by being jobs were different. To avoid any possible confusion, that form of mismatch affecting only employed individuals will be referred as "on-the-job" mismatch, in the more general case of workers being both over and under-skilled for their jobs (vertical on-the-job mismatch) or have different skills/qualifications (horizontal on-the-job mismatch) and as skill gap to refer to employed workers whose skills are lower than those required by their jobs. It follows that skill mismatch, as it is defined here, can result in the occurrence of both skill shortages and on-the-job mismatches (both vertical and horizontal).

Economists generally believe that labour markets adjust to such imbalances, especially over time, but it is also possible for such mismatches to persist for many years or decades. In such instances, adverse equilibria, characterized by more structural unemployment, long-term unfilled vacancies and/or lower labour force participation may arise, and employers may eventually be forced to hire workers who possess lower or just different skills, giving place to the mismatch "on the job". Public policy interventions to change or improve the match of workers to employers might be appropriate in such cases.

In the United States, following the Great Recession, there was a marked shift in the Beveridge curve. A 2012 International Monetary Fund (IMF) said the shift can be explained in part by "extended unemployment insurance benefits" and "skill mismatch" between unemployment and vacancies.

See also
 Labour economics
 Search theory
 Matching theory
 Types of unemployment
 Phillips curve
 Involuntary unemployment

References

Sources

External links
 
 
 
 
 
 

Economics curves